Operation Matterhorn was a military operation of the United States Army Air Forces in World War II for the strategic bombing of Japanese forces by B-29 Superfortresses based in India and China. Targets included Japan itself, and Japanese bases in China and South East Asia. The name comes from the Matterhorn, a mountain traditionally considered particularly difficult to climb.

Plan 
The idea of basing the Superfortresses in China first surfaced at the Casablanca Conference in January 1943. While planners assessed this option, the Anglo-American Combined Chiefs of Staff, meeting in Quebec in August, authorized a central Pacific drive that included the seizure of the Mariana Islands. Not only were the Marianas closer to Tokyo, but once in Allied hands they could be supplied and defended more easily than other sites. In September, Combined Chiefs of Staff planners concluded that B-29s in China, isolated from resupply except by inclusion in the Hump airlift, would be plagued by logistical problems. However, President Franklin D. Roosevelt decided in favor of the China bases because he was impatient to bomb Japan and wished to bolster the Chinese war effort. At the Sextant Conference in Cairo at the end of the year, he promised Chiang Kai-shek that the very heavy bombers would be coming to his country. General Henry H. Arnold supported that decision as a temporary expedient, but still preferred strategic missions against Japan from the Marianas, once bases there were available. The operation was originally called Drake, with the use of long-range B-24s as well as B-29s.

Operation Matterhorn was developed by Brig. Gen. Kenneth B. Wolfe in October 1943 for implementation by the XX Bomber Command. Wolfe drew from an initial plan termed "Setting Sun" based on an outline drawn by President Franklin D. Roosevelt at the Casablanca Conference and from a counter-plan offered by Gen. Joseph Stilwell called "Twilight". (The primary difference between the two was that Chennault proposed that the B-29s be permanently based in India and forward-based in China.) The forward airbases in China would be self-sustaining, supplied out of India by flying materiel over the Hump using B-29s, a fleet of C-109 fuel tankers, 20 C-87 transports, and three C-46 bomber support squadrons. Under Setting Sun, the forward bases were to be in Guangxi in southern China, but because of intense Japanese pressure against the forces commanded by Stilwell and Gen. Claire Chennault, the Matterhorn plan moved the bases farther inland to Chengdu.

General Arnold approved the plan on October 12 and presented it to the U.S. Joint Chiefs after convincing President Roosevelt, through Gen. George C. Marshall as an intermediary, that no other strategic bombing of Japan was possible until the capture of the Mariana Islands, which was not yet scheduled. Roosevelt was unhappy with the projected starting date of June 1, 1944, having promised Chiang Kai-shek that the campaign would begin January 1, 1944, but he agreed on condition that the campaign be continued for a year.

Campaign 
Advance Army Air Forces echelons arrived in India in December 1943 to organize the building of airfields in India and China. Thousands of Indians labored to construct four permanent bases in eastern India around Kharagpur. As well as construction or modification of airfields in Bengal, a fuel pipeline to Calcutta and expansion of the port there was proposed. Meanwhile,  to the northeast, across the Himalayan mountains, about 350,000 Chinese workers toiled to build four staging bases in western China near Chengtu (where Chennault had already developed airfields) and new airfields near Kunming.

The original plan envisioned two combat wings of 150 bombers each, but in April 1944 the second of those wings had not been sufficiently organized, equipped, or trained, and XX Bomber Command was reduced to a single bomb wing, fatally crippling its ability to sustain itself by airlift. By April 1944, the four B-29 groups of the 58th Bombardment Wing were available in Asia, and eight operating bases had become operational.

To avoid  the risk that B-29s might be wasted on the battlefields when they would be much more useful against the Japanese home islands, the Joint Chiefs approved the establishment in April 1944 of the Twentieth Air Force, setting the stage for Operation Matterhorn.

Acting as executive agent for the Joint Chiefs, Arnold named himself the Twentieth's commander, and the AAF Air Staff as also the Air Staff of the Twentieth Air Force. Brig. Gen. Haywood S. Hansell served as chief of staff and de facto commander of the Twentieth after Arnold suffered a heart attack in May. Centralized control of the Superfortresses from Washington marked the recognition of the B-29 as a strategic weapon that transcended theaters and services. That same month, the first Superfortresses arrived in India, having flown across the Atlantic Ocean using the South Atlantic Transport route from Morrison Field, Florida to Natal, Brazil then across to North Africa, then to Arabia, and Persia. Accompanying them was Major General Kenneth B. Wolfe, the designated commander of the XX Bomber Command, which had been reassigned from the Second Air Force as the operational component of the Twentieth Air Force. Although a brilliant officer in research and development, with an excellent knowledge of the B-29, Wolfe had no upper echelon command or operational experience and was thus an unfortunate choice to command the first B-29 operations. The 58th Bomb Wing headquarters also arrived in India during the spring of 1944.

A committee of operations analysts who advised the Joint Chiefs of Staff and the Twentieth Air Force on targets recommended Superfortress attacks on coke ovens and steel factories in Manchuria and Kyūshū. Shutting down these key industries would severely cripple the enemy's war effort. Also on the target list were important enemy harbor facilities and aircraft factories. Of the 98 bombers that took off from India, 77 hit their targets, dropping 368 tons of bombs. Encouraged by the results, XX Bomber Command prepared for the first raids against Japan.

The June 15, 1944, mission – the first raid on the Japanese home islands since the Doolittle raid of April 1942 – marked the beginning of the strategic bombardment campaign against Japan. Like the Doolittle attack, it achieved little physical destruction. Only forty-seven of the sixty-eight B–29s airborne hit the target area; four aborted with mechanical problems, four crashed, six jettisoned their bombs because of mechanical difficulties, and others bombed secondary targets or targets of opportunity. Only one B–29 was lost to enemy aircraft over the target, while another was strafed and destroyed by Japanese aircraft after making an emergency landing at Neihsiang.

The second full-scale strike did not occur until July 7, 1944. By then, Arnold, impatient with Wolfe's progress, had replaced him temporarily with Brigadier General LaVern G. Saunders, until Major General Curtis E. LeMay could arrive from Europe to assume permanent command. Unfortunately, the three-week delay between the first and second missions reflected serious problems that prevented a sustained strategic bombing campaign from China against Japan. Each B–29 mission consumed tremendous quantities of fuel and bombs, which had to be shuttled from India to the China bases over the Himalayas, the world's highest mountain range. For every Superfortress combat mission, the command flew an average of six B–29 round-trip cargo missions over the Hump, using both tactical aircraft and B-29s modified as fuel tankers. When it was immediately apparent that the operation would never be self-sustaining, the Air Transport Command was called upon to support Matterhorn with allocations on its Hump airlift, taken from the allocations to the Fourteenth Air Force already in China. In September 1944 70 C-109s were added to the effort, flown by surplus B-29 crews, but XX Bomber Command, fearful of diversions to other agencies, resisted all attempts to have them operated by ATC. Its transport procedures contradicted those of ATC, however, limiting its efficiency, and beginning in November 1944 its B-29s were withdrawn from the airlift and the C-109s transferred to ATC. With plans already developed to shut down B-29 forward basing in China at the end of January 1945, ATC took over the logistical supply of the bases in China, too late to provide the volume required to stockpile materiel. In the end, 42,000 tons of cargo were delivered over the Hump to XX Bomber Command between April 1944 and January 1945, nearly two-thirds of it by ATC.

Range presented another problem. Kyūshū, in southwestern Japan, was the only one of the major home islands within the  combat radius of the Superfortress.

The very heavy bomber still suffered mechanical problems that grounded some aircraft and forced others to turn back before dropping their bombs. Even those B–29s that reached the target area often had difficulty in hitting the objective, partly because of extensive cloud cover or high winds. Larger formations could have helped compensate for inaccurate bombing, but Saunders did not have enough B–29s to dispatch large formations. Also, the Twentieth Air Force periodically diverted the Superfortresses from strategic targets to support theater commanders in Southeast Asia and the southwestern Pacific. For these reasons, the XX Bomber Command and the B–29s largely failed to fulfill their strategic promise.

On August 20, LeMay arrived to breathe new energy into the XX Bomber Command. The former Eighth Air Force group and wing commander had achieved remarkable success with strategic bombing operations in Europe, testing new concepts such as stagger formations, the combat box, and straight-and-level bombing runs. The youngest two-star general in the Army Air Forces had also revised tactics, tightened and expanded formations, and enhanced training for greater bombing precision. He inaugurated a lead-crew training school so that formations could learn to drop as a unit on cue from the aircraft designated as the lead ship.

During his first two months at XX Bomber Command, LeMay had little more success than Wolfe or Saunders. The command continued to average only about one sortie a month per aircraft against Japan's home islands. When Douglas MacArthur invaded the Philippines in October 1944, LeMay diverted his B-29s from bombing Japanese steel facilities to striking enemy aircraft factories and bases in Formosa, Kyūshū, and Manchuria.

Meanwhile, LeMay gained the support of Communist leader Mao Zedong, who controlled parts of northern China. Willing to help against a common enemy, Mao agreed to assist downed American airmen and to locate in northern China a weather station that would provide better forecasts for the XX Bomber Command's raids on the Japanese in Manchuria and Kyūshū. Hoping to gain American recognition of his own regime, Mao suggested that the Americans set up B–29 bases in northern China like those in Chiang Kai-shek's area of control in southern China. LeMay declined, however, because he found it difficult enough to supply the airfields at Chengtu.

Ichi-Go and the first "fire raid" of Hankow (Wuhan) 

Lemay continued to experiment with new technologies and tactics and soon imported to China the incendiary weapons being used by the British against Germany. In late 1944, a Japanese offensive (codenamed Operation Ichi-Go) in China probed toward the B–29 and Air Transport Command bases around Chengdu and Kunming.

To slow the enemy advance, Maj. Gen. Claire L. Chennault of the Fourteenth Air Force asked for raids on Japanese supplies at Hankow (an area now part of present-day Wuhan), and the Joint Chiefs directed LeMay to hit the city with firebombs. On December 18, LeMay launched the fire raid, sending eighty-four B–29s in at medium altitude with five hundred tons of incendiary bombs. The attack left Hankow burning for three days, proving the effectiveness of incendiary weapons against the predominantly wooden architecture of the Far East.

By late 1944, American bombers were raiding Japan from the recently captured Marianas, making operations from the vulnerable and logistically impractical China bases unnecessary. In January 1945, the XX Bomber Command abandoned its bases in China and concentrated 58th Bomb Wing resources in India. The transfer signaled the end of Matterhorn. During the same month, LeMay moved to the Marianas, leaving command of the XX Bomber Command in India to Brig. Gen. Roger M. Ramey. Between January and March, Ramey's B–29s assisted Mountbatten in the South-East Asian theatre, supporting British and Indian ground forces in Burma by targeting rail and port facilities in Indochina, Thailand, and Burma. More distant targets included refineries and airfields in Singapore, Malaya, as well as Palembang and other locations in the Netherlands East Indies. The 58th, the only operational wing of the XX Bomber Command, remained in India until the end of March 1945, when it moved to the Marianas to join the XXI Bomber Command.

XX Bomber Command stopped being an operational command at the end of March 1945 when the 58th Bomb Wing moved from India to the Marianas and control of the wing passed to the XXI Bomber Command.

Assessment 
The American Bomber Summary Survey states that "Approximately 800 tons of bombs were dropped by China-based B-29s on Japanese home island targets from June 1944 to January 1945. These raids were of insufficient weight and accuracy to produce significant results." XX Bomber Command had failed to achieve the strategic objectives that the planners had intended for Operation Matterhorn, largely because of logistical problems, the bomber's mechanical difficulties, the vulnerability of Chinese staging bases (see Operation Ichi-Go), and the extreme range required to reach key Japanese cities. Although the B–29s achieved some success when diverted to support Chiang Kai-shek's forces in China, MacArthur's offensives in the Philippines, and Mountbatten's efforts in the Burma Campaign, they generally accomplished little more than the B-17 Flying Fortresses and B-24 Liberators assigned to the Fourteenth, Fifth, Thirteenth, and Tenth Air Forces.

Chennault considered the Twentieth Air Force a liability and thought that its supplies of fuel and bombs could have been more profitably used by his Fourteenth Air Force. The XX Bomber Command consumed almost 15 percent of the Hump airlift tonnage per month during Matterhorn. Lt. Gen. Albert C. Wedemeyer, who replaced Lt. Gen. Joseph W. Stilwell as American senior commander in the China theater, agreed with Chennault. The two were happy to see the B–29s leave China and India. Yet, despite those objections, Matterhorn did benefit the Allied effort. Using the China bases bolstered Chinese morale and, more important, it allowed the strategic bombing of Japan to begin six months before bases were available in the Marianas. The Matterhorn raids against the Japanese home islands also demonstrated the B–29's effectiveness against Japanese fighters and anti-aircraft artillery. Operations from the Marianas would profit from the streamlined organization and improved tactics developed on the Asian mainland.

Command structure 
General Arnold retained personal command of the Twentieth Air Force – to avoid diversion of assets from the B-29 effort against Japan, particularly by Admiral Nimitz, who was given command authority over all efforts in the Central Pacific – with Brigadier General Haywood S. Hansell as chief of staff (and later commander of XXI Bomber Command). Tentative plans called for an operational force of 48 B-29 groups, numbering between 1,000 and 1,500 B-29s, to be deployed in four bomber commands (the XX BC of 4 groups in India-China, the XXI BC of 16 groups in the Marianas, the XXII BC of 24 groups in the Philippines and Okinawa, and the XXIII BC of 4 groups in the Aleutians).

Original plans for XX Bomber Command to employ two combat wings in China (the 58th and 73rd Combat Bomb Wings) were changed on 2 March 1944 when limited numbers of operational B-29s resulted in only the 58th CBW assigned. There, after poor bombing results, and as developing operations deemed the original complex organization unnecessary, it was deemed a redundant level of command and its four groups moved to Guam in April 1945 as part of XXI Bomber Command.

The bases in China were part of the China Burma India Theater of World War II for administrative purposes.  The commander of the XX Bomber Command had no control over stations, bases, units, and personnel not directly assigned to him, and none over shipping and other logistic support essential to the operation.  However the Commander-in-Chief of the XX Bomber Command reported directly to the JCS in Washington and was not under SEAC operational control like the rest of the personnel in the CBI.

The British planning to deploy their new Very Long Range Bomber Force (of about 22 squadrons) to the Far East for final operations against the Japanese, proposed that Twentieth Air Force be controlled by the Combined Chiefs, as had the air forces in Europe, but when the Americans rejected the proposal (because the forces involved were overwhelmingly American), the British dropped the issue.

Operational Command Structure 
General Henry "Hap" Arnold named himself the commander of the Twentieth Air Force. Brigadier General Haywood S. Hansell became Twentieth Air Force chief of staff. The subordinate commanders of XX Bomber Command were:
 Major General Kenneth B. Wolfe
 Brigadier General LaVerne G. Saunders
 Major General Curtis E. LeMay
 Brigadier General Roger M. Ramey

Notes

References

Attribution
 (backup site)
Chapter 4: The Superfortress Takes to the Skies
Chapter 5: Over the Hump to Matterhorn

Further reading 
 
 Chapter XIII 
 Appendix B

External links 
 https://web.archive.org/web/20050311211933/http://www.usaaf.net/ww2/hittinghome/hittinghomepg5.htm
 http://historynet.com/ahi/bloperationmatterhorn/index.html 

Matterhorn
Matterhorn
Matterhorn
1944 in Japan
1944 in the United States
1944 in Vietnam
Attacks on military installations in the 1940s